Holar (or Hollar) is a city in the Sehnsa tehsil of Kotli District, of Azad Kashmir, Pakistan. It has a crossing on the Jhelum river, which used to be called Owen Pattan in the princely state of Jammu and Kashmir, but now called Holar bridge. The Kahuta–Kotli road passes over the bridge.

References

Bibliography
 
  

Populated places in Kotli District